is a square in Tokyo, Japan.

It features the largest statue of Godzilla in the country, based on the Shin Godzilla design of the character, with an original screenplay for the 1954 film being contained within the base. The current statue replaces another of Godzilla, based on the Heisei design that was commissioned in 1995 as a memorial for the character's death in the film Godzilla vs. Destoroyah, which was relocated to Toho Cinemas Hibiya in 2018.

References

External links
 

Chiyoda, Tokyo
Tourist attractions in Tokyo
Godzilla (franchise)